Joel Dreibelbis Farm  is a historic farm complex and national historic district located in Richmond Township, Berks County, Pennsylvania.  It has 13 contributing buildings, 1 contributing site, and 2 contributing structures. They include a 2 1/2-story, brick vernacular Federal-style farmhouse (1868); 1 1/2-story, summer kitchen (c. 1870); 1 1/2-story, stone and frame combination smokehouse / wash house / storage cellar (1882); stone ice house (c. 1875); frame Pennsylvania bank barn on a stone foundation (1908); wagon shed / corn crib; and farm related outbuildings. The property also includes an abandoned limestone quarry and abandoned railroad bed and bridge.

It was listed on the National Register of Historic Places in 1989.

Gallery

References

Farms on the National Register of Historic Places in Pennsylvania
Historic districts on the National Register of Historic Places in Pennsylvania
Federal architecture in Pennsylvania
Houses completed in 1868
Houses in Berks County, Pennsylvania
National Register of Historic Places in Berks County, Pennsylvania